Holopea is an extinct genus of fossil sea snails, Paleozoic gastropod mollusks in the family Holopeidae.

These molluscs were stationary epifaunal suspension feeders. They lived in the Paleozoic Era, Ordovician Period, upper Arenigian age (between 478.6 ± 1.7 and 471.8 ± 1.6 million years ago) to the Carboniferous period, lower Serpukhovian age (from 328.3 (± 1.6) Ma to 318.1 (± 1.3) mya).

Distribution
These fossil gastropods are found in: the Permian of China; the Devonian of Australia, Canada, United States; the Silurian of Australia, Canada, Russia, Sweden, United Kingdom, United States; the Ordovician of Canada, China, the Czech Republic, Estonia, Iran, New Zealand, Norway, Sweden, the United Kingdom, United States; Chazy of Canada; Arenig of Greenland.

See also
 List of marine gastropod genera in the fossil record
 † Holopea antiquata J. Perner, 1903 (synonym: † Turbo balticus E.F.R.K. Koken & J. Perner, 1925)
 † Holopea bomiensis Y.-T. Pan, 1978   (unassessed)

References 

 Pan, Y.-T. (1978). Gastropoda. In: Chengdu Institute of Geology and Mineral Resources (Ed.) Paleontological Atlas of Southwest China. Sichuan Volume 2. Geological Publishing House, Beijing, pp. 403–428

External links
 J. Hall. 1847. Containing descriptions of the organic remains of the lower division of the New York system (equivalent of the Lower Silurian rocks of Europe). Paleontology of New York 1:1-338
 Paleobiology Database
Sepkoski, Jack Sepkoski's Online Genus Database

Holopeidae
Ordovician gastropods
Silurian gastropods
Devonian gastropods
Carboniferous gastropods
Paleozoic animals of Asia
Ordovician animals of Europe
Fossils of the Czech Republic
Letná Formation
Early Ordovician first appearances
Carboniferous extinctions
Paleozoic life of Ontario
Paleozoic life of Manitoba
Paleozoic life of Nova Scotia
Paleozoic life of Nunavut
Paleozoic life of Quebec